Arena Civica, officially Arena Gianni Brera, is a multi-purpose stadium in Milan, Italy, which was opened on 18 August 1807. One of the city's main examples of neoclassical architecture, today it mainly hosts football and rugby union games, concerts and cultural events. The stadium can hold 18,000–30,000 spectators.

The Arena is the home pitch for Milan's third football team, Brera Calcio, as well as being the host venue for an annual athletics meeting – the Notturna di Milano. Until 2011 the Arena was the home ground of Amatori Rugby Milano, a rugby union club founded in 1927 that won 18 Italian Championships.

History 
The Arena Civica opened on 18 August 1807, and later it was used for football activities, mainly by Inter: initially only for the biggest matches and afterwards on a stable basis, from 1930 until 10 December 1958, when the Nerazzurri faced Lyon for the Fairs Cup. It was used on 15 May 1910 in the Italy national football team's first official match, a 6–2 victory over France.

During its history it has been used for many kinds of events, including the reconstruction of naval battles; William Frederick Cody ("Buffalo Bill") twice brought his "Wild West Show" here. Other artists who performed at the Arena include Chicago, Joe Cocker, Stewart Copeland, The Cure, Little Feat, Ben Harper, Lenny Kravitz, Lou Reed, The Manhattan Transfer, Robert Plant, Public Image Limited, Radiohead, Patti Smith, Ringo Starr, Rod Stewart, Sting and Andy Summers. The Arena is also the site of the Milan Jazzin' Festival.
In 2003, it was renamed "Arena Gianni Brera" in honor of the sportswriter and journalist Gianni Brera.

Facilities 
 one 6-lane/400 m track
 one football and rugby pitch (100 x 86 m)

See also 
 San Siro (or Stadio Giuseppe Meazza)
 Gianni Brera
 Parco Sempione
 Brera Calcio
 Palazzina Appiani

References

External links 
 Description On Comune di Milano website
 ARENA CIVICA.doc , a document in Microsoft Word format from the Comune di Milano website offering a history of the arena.
 Arena Civica History of the Arena Civica (Italian)
 History of the Arena Civica (French)
 

Civica
Sports venues in Milan
Multi-purpose stadiums in Italy
Sports venues completed in 1807
Tourist attractions in Milan
Athletics (track and field) venues in Italy
1807 establishments in Europe